Structured Word Inquiry (SWI) is a pedagogical technique involving the scientific investigation of the spelling of words. SWI considers morphology, etymology, relatives, and phonology. The guiding principles of SWI are (1) "the primary function of English spelling is to represent meaning" and (2) "conventions by which English spelling represents meaning are so well-ordered and reliable that spelling can be investigated and understood through scientific inquiry."

Four questions
SWI uses four questions to investigate the spelling of a word:
 What is the meaning of a word?
 What are the morphemes of the word?
 What are morphological and etymological relatives of the word?
 What are the letters doing in the word (spelling phonemes, functioning as markers, zeroed)?

The questions must be investigated in order starting with the meaning.

Word sums
A word sum shows how a word is built. A word sum is a "necessary tool to allow falsification of hypotheses of orthographic morphological structure."

The following are examples of word sums:
 de + sign -> design
 de + sign + ate + ed-> designated
 sign + al -> signal
 sign + ate + ure -> signature
 re + sign + ate + ion -> resignation

Word Matrices

A word matrix is a visualization of the morphology of related words.

References

Etymology
Spelling
Orthography
Writing
Linguistic morphology
Learning
Learning to read
Early childhood education